The Bishop's School is an Indian private, unaided (independent) minority school, for boarding and day students between Nursery and 12th grade. It is located in Pune, which is the cultural capital of the state of Maharashtra. It was founded in 1864 by Bishop Harding, the adjutant general of the British Indian Army. The school was envisioned as a self-supporting institution founded for the children of warrant officers and non-commissioned officers stationed at Pune who, not belonging to Regiments, did not have regimental facilities. The first headmaster was a British Army Corporal, Robert Mansfield. The current officiating principal is Joel Edwin. It is one of India's oldest education institutions. The Bishop's School students and alumni are called "Bishopites" and students, faculty and staff often refer to the school simply as "Bishop's".

History

Origins
The school was established by Lt. Col. Sydney T. Stock on 19 April 1864 to cater to the sons of warrant officers and non-commissioned officers of the British Indian Army.  The school has since functioned as a Christian Anglo-Indian minority institution.  It is located in the Pune Cantonment. In addition to its day school, Bishop's has a boarding school.

The school has three branches, with the one in Camp being the first and oldest, and an all-boys school. The school has opened two branches in the Kalyani Nagar and Undri areas of Pune. These branches, unlike the flagship camp branch, are co-educational.

In the 2012 Education World India survey the school was ranked 1st in Pune, 12th in the state of Maharashtra, and 44th in India.

The school is affiliated with the Council for the Indian School Certificate Examinations (CISCE), New Delhi.

The School Song

We sing our school song, with a voice loud and strong,
We chant “Bishop’s” name with a will.
It’s the School that we honour,
the best school of all !
Let our chorus now re-echo to the hills.

The pure Deccan winds waft our theme
to the world.
We are proud of our past and today,
May God bless our dear school and
enkindle the flame
In each spirit that within her works and plays.

The flowers all around speak of beauty serene,
And as symbols of strength the hills stand,
While the “Mulla” like progress flows on
through the days,
Nature’s lessons are before us to command

The years will press on, and the cares
of the world,
May make us forget for a while,
But the thought of the School shall
inspire us anew,
Give us courage, greater strength and
peace of mind.

When life’s work is done and the past
echoes by,
And we ponder on days left behind,
We shall look back with pride on the
School that we love,
The Alma Mater that our memories
enshrine.

And when at long last our life’s course we have run,
May the world be aware of us then,
That we honoured our School that
taught us how to live,
To be “THOROUGH”, to be true,
and to be men.

Let the welkin resound with our loud
clarion call,
“Play up Bishop’s ! never let our
Colours fall !”
“Play up, Bishop’s ! never let our
Colours fall !”.
      --- by A.E.Lunn.

Location and branches

The main campus is situated in Pune Cantonment,  from the Pune Railway Station. It is one of the oldest school campuses in India, and one of the most important landmarks of Pune. Adjacent to the campus is the St. Marys Church built by the British in the 19th century.

Following the rapid development of the city, and increasing demand for education, the school opened two new branches at the Kalyani Nagar and Undri areas of Pune.

Administration

The school is administered by a board of governors. Traditionally many of its members are or were military officers. They formed the Bishop's Education Society. The management council appoints a principal to administer the schools and the society appoints a headmaster to administer the Camp School.

Clothing

Mr. A.E. Lunn (principal from 1947 to 1972) created the all-white school uniform, with a maroon and gold stable belt, which includes a brass buckle emblazoned with the school crest of a Bishop's mitre and the school motto "Thorough" embossed on the buckle. Other items include a maroon blazer with the school crest emblazoned on the top left pocket in the individual's house colour. This changed in the 1960s to a gold school crest with the school motto "Thorough" and the date 1864 to that year's date often with personalised information on the owner's status, such as 'House Captain' or 'Prefect'. This was only possible because the school crest was sewn on to the blazer top left pocket. The blazer was initially given to students of class 10 and students of the Junior College only. Beginning with the academic year 2016-2017 it was also given to students of class 9.

At some point in the 1970s the school crest was sewn directly onto the blazer pocket, so the title of 'Prefect' now appears on a lapel pin badge. The blazer buttons are silver with a gold school crest on them. The school jumper is a maroon v-neck with two gold bands around the neck and waistline of the garment. The school tie is maroon with gold stripes, while school house captains and prefects wear a maroon tie with the gold school crest emblazoned upon it.

After school hours the blues and greys uniforms are worn during free time and recreation. This consists of a blue shirt and grey trousers. For sports and recreational activities individuals wear their house shirts and shorts, which have two stripes of that individual's house colours running along the seams.

House system

The school started with three houses, Mansfield House (maroon), Harding House (blue), and Arnould House (green). These houses were sufficient because there were only 120 boys and seven staff members under the Rev. A.R. Cooper, who was principal from 1919–1946. Mr, A.E. Lunn took over as Principal in 1947.

Mr. William J. Wright joined Bishops in 1948 and was appointed the new fourth Bishops House master between 1950 and 1953. There were now four houses: Arnold House (green), Harding House (blue), Mansfield House (maroon) and Bishops House (gold/yellow). Every student on joining Bishops joins one of these houses. Their individual merits are added up with the rest of the members of the house and at the end of each academic year all the points are added up. The house with the greatest number of points is awarded the title "Cocke House".

In Bishop's Kalyaninagar there are four houses: Cooper (green), Freese (blue), Roberts (red), and Lunn (yellow).

In Bishop's Undri, there are four houses namely: Rae (red), O'Connor (green), Wintle (blue) and Young (gold/yellow).

Grading system

Instead of deriving a student's percentage at the end of a semester there is a point system. For every bracket of marks a student gets, a certain point score is allocated. The student with the fewest points gets to the highest level in class. In the senior classes, students are marked according to the ICSE Board exam pattern to provide a picture of their expected performance on the Board exams.

Academics

The school provides education up to the 10+2 level (ICSE and ISC). The average percentage of the students is 72 percent, with at least 40 boys scoring above 90 percent in each grade. The percentage of students who pass in this school is 100%.

Sports

Sports offered include badminton, football, cricket, basketball, table tennis, hockey, volleyball, chess, swimming, and tennis. Many Bishop's alumni have played in the Ranji Trophy cricket tournaments. The school has won the PSAAA football cup 18 times and has triumphed in the All India Anglo-Indian football cup three times. It has won the PSAAA cricket cup seven times.

Other sports offered at the school are boxing (one of only two schools in Maharashtra to have it as part of its regular activities) and athletics. There are long distance runs where juniors run  and seniors run .

Activities
Mr. A.E. Lunn, principal of the school, revived the First Pune Bharat Scout Group in the early 1950s, which promoted outdoor activities and community services. The scout troop grew so large, it had to be split into two and the 'B' Troop was formed by Mr. Tommy Thompson. The school also had a troop of Cub Scouts for junior individuals.

The Scout Troops were closely allied to the Army School of Physical Training, the National Defence Academy, and the State Reserve Police Force, the Maharashtra State armed paramilitary police force and the military ammunition factory in Kirkee. Because of these connections, the First Pune Bharat Scout Troops, had the distinction of using the military and SRPF firing ranges and test firing all types of munitions including LMGs (Light Machine Guns), HMGs (50 calibre Heavy Machine Guns), and 17 lbs 76mm tank guns, mortars and anti-tank weapons.

It was not unusual to have 13-year-olds, driving and commanding battle tanks on these military weapons training firing ranges under the command of regular military or SRPF officers. The First Pune Bharat Scout troop also had boats, which included a cox eight racing boat.
When the Panshet and Khadakwasla dams burst on 12 July 1961 causing loss of life in Pune, the Bishops School First Pune Bharat Scout Troops were sent into the affected areas to support the clean up operations.

Every Friday evening at 21.00 Hrs the school screens a film, which was arranged by Mrs. Corrine Danielles & Mrs. Christina Dunn for all the boarders and dayscholars, a tradition that continues to the present day. The school holds concerts including a joint staff and student play at the end of every academic year that is open to the public, choirs, debates, quiz competitions, essay writing, science fair, art competition, boxing, and gymnastics display.

Notable alumni

 Late Lieutenant General Inder Kumar Chhitwal, PVSM. Indian Army<ref></https://www.tribuneindia.com/2001/20010126/nation.htm#1></ref>
 Sabeer Bhatia, Founder - Hotmail (now known as Outlook.com post acquisition by Microsoft)
 Cyrus Poonawalla, Chairman - Poonawala Group
 Admiral Sushil Kumar, Chief of Naval Staff, Indian Navy, 1998-2001
 Lt. General Bhopinder Singh, Director General, Military Training, Indian Army, (Retd.)
 Lt. General Manomoy Ganguly, VSM, PHS, Director General Army Medical Services (DGMS), Indian Army
 Farrukh Dhondy, Author of Bombay Duck and Poona Company
 Gautam Bambawale, Indian diplomat and the incumbent Indian Ambassador to China
 Dr. Sajjid Chinoy, Chief India Economist, JP Morgan, Ph.D, Stanford University
 Samir Bodas, Co-Founder and CEO, Icertis Inc. United States 
 Pankaj Sharma, President - The Lexicon Group of Institutes, Pune
 Ken Ghosh, Indian Film Director
 Purab Kohli, Indian Model, VJ and actor
 Sashi Menon, Indian Davis Cup, ATP Tour Pro
 Anandamoy Roychowdhary, Director, Technology - Sequoia Capital
 Shubhomoy Mukherjee, Director, BlackRock
 Sushil Nadkarni, Indian-American cricketer
 Udit Birla, Maharashtra & Madhya Pradesh State Cricket Teams and Pune Warriors India
 Gaurav Parmar, Maharashtra State Cricket Team and Indian Zonal Cricket Academy (West Zone) - BCCI
 Sanjay Jha, Spokesperson - Indian National Congress

See also

List of schools in Pune

References

External links
 , the school's official website
 Some images of the school

Schools in Colonial India
Primary schools in India
High schools and secondary schools in Maharashtra
Boarding schools in Maharashtra
Christian schools in Maharashtra
Private schools in Maharashtra
Schools in Pune
Educational institutions established in 1864
1864 establishments in India